is an anime television series produced by GEMBA, which aired from January to March 2019. A smartphone game titled Kōya no Kotobuki Hikōtai - Ōzora no Take Off Girls! was released in February 2019. A compilation film titled The Magnificent Kotobuki Complete Edition premiered in September 2020.

Plot
In a desolate land, people trade goods with each other to survive. Goods are transported via huge zeppelins which hire squadrons of fighter pilots for defense against air pirates and carry their single-engine fighter planes on board. One of these is the Kotobuki Squadron, a team of six young women: Kylie, Emma, Kate, Reona, Zara and Chika.

Characters

Kotobuki Squadron

She is a pilot with excellent skills, a natural aptitude for flying and a passion for pancakes. She first flew with Ol' Sab (Shioyama) when she was a young girl. Every member of the squadron has a personal emblem painted on their tail and variation of it on their wingtips, with Kylie's being a bird of prey in her personal colour, red; the squadron's spinners are also painted in their personal colour. She has short black hair and wears a buttoned red coat.

Kylie's childhood friend, and a pilot with superior dogfight senses and observational skills. She has the reputation of being called "Emma the Fierce". Her personal emblem is a scythe and rose, with rose thorns along the rear fuselage and wingtips; Emma's personal color is blue, though the rose part is white. Her blonde hair is tied in a bun, although she kept her shoulder length bangs free. She wears a blue dress.

She is a logical thinker and generally prefers to remain silent. Kate's personal emblem is an arrow pointing opposite directions, in purple. She has long silver hair tied back in two ponytails and wore a white dress shirt with a blue ribbon at the collar.

She is the unit's commanding officer and most experienced member, sensible and a down-to-earth pilot. Among the girls, she once had the reputation of being called "Reona the Tenacious". Her personal mark is a zig-zag shape over three horizontal stripes, and her Hayabusa also has diagonal stripes over the inboard section of the wings, all in green. She has short red hair tied up and wears a white short sleeve shirt under a green top.

She is the unit's executive officer and generally watches over the squadron members. Zara was a founding member of the squadron, along with Reona. Zara has the most personalized paint scheme, featuring gold swirl patterns over most of her Hayabusa; she is the only member of the squadron to not have her wingtips painted. She has long brown hair and her yellow and white outfit shows her midriff.

She is the squadron's youngest member and tends to act without thinking. Despite her small stature, she can take out guys twice her size in a brawl. Chika's Hayabusa features pink lightning bolt patterns on the rear fuselage and wingtips, as well as a childish depiction of some sort of animal on the tail (which is not in pink). She has short brown hair tied up in two ponytails and wears a pink coat unbuttoned.

Hagoromo Crew

Madam Loulou is president of the Ōni Company which is involved in the transportation of goods and materials. She projects a confident and imposing figure.

He is the indecisive commanding officer of the Hagoromo airship and intimidated by Madam Loulou.

She is a senior member of the crew of the Hagoromo airship and a headstrong and determined girl who can be critical of Saneatsu.

She is one of the pilots of the airship Hagoromo and is less outspoken than Anna. She always talks about shopping with the latter. 

She is one of three similar-looking girls who the crew on the Hagoromo airship. She has red eyes and wears a matching tie.

She is one of three similar-looking girls who the crew on the Hagoromo airship. She has yellow eyes and wears a matching tie.

She is one of three similar-looking girls who the crew on the Hagoromo airship. She has green eyes and wears a matching tie.

She is the chief of the maintenance crew for the fighters. Although she looks childlike, she is a full-fledged adult and unafraid to speak her mind, but she also tends to be a potty mouth.

He is the owner and bartender of the bar on board the Hagoromo that the pilots frequent. He serves drinks, cooks food and has a calm and quiet personality. He is also an excellent marksman and ex-mercenary who quit after he met and fell in love with Miki.

She is the waitress in Johnny's bar and acts disinterested in her job, but is very capable in a crisis.

Other characters

A wealthy politician and the councilor in the city of Aleshma in Ikesuka, she owns one of the city's luxurious hotel called "Ocean Sunfish Hotel". Just like Loulou, she too is headstrong and very imposing. However the two hated each other that they don't see eye to eye.

He is the Head of the View Trading company, who, later on becomes the Mayor of the city of Aleshma in Ikesuka. For some reason Julia both mistrusted and despises him for his cheap magic trick. He is often in the company of his butler and he was once an ace pilot who fought in the battle of Rinouche eight years ago where at one time he saved Reona's life. 
Nazarin Squadron
 and 
 (Adolfo), Satoru Yamamoto (Fernando)
The Nazarin Squadron originally consisted of five pilots: Adolfo, Fernando, Ismael, Miguel and Rodriguez. However after their first encounter with air pirates in the story, only Adolfo and Fernando remain. In the past, Fernando used to be a priest.

Anime
The series is directed by Tsutomu Mizushima and written by Michiko Yokote, both of whom had previously worked on the anime series Shirobako, and features character designs by Hidari. The series aired from January 13 to March 31, 2019 on Tokyo MX, TVA, MBS, and BS11. It is animated by GEMBA, with Digital Frontier handling production and Wao World and Actas handling 2D animation. Shirō Hamaguchi composes the series' music. The series' opening theme song "Sora no Ne" is performed by ZAQ, and the series' ending theme "Tsubasa o Motsu Mono-tachi" is performed by the main cast under the name Kotobuki Squadron. The series is licensed by Sentai Filmworks.

A compilation film titled The Magnificent Kotobuki Complete Edition premiered on September 11, 2020. It includes new footage not seen in the series.

Episode list

Notes

References

External links
Official website 

2019 anime television series debuts
Anime with original screenplays
GEMBA (studio)
Sentai Filmworks
Shōnen manga
Shueisha books
Shueisha manga
Tokyo MX original programming